Pandesma decaryi is a moth of the family Erebidae. It is native to central & south-western Madagascar.

Berio described this species in 1966 as looking very similar to Pandesma anysa Guenée, 1852 as found in Eritrea. It has a wingspan of 38mm.

References

Pandesmini
Moths described in 1966
Moths of Africa
Moths of Madagascar
Taxa named by Pierre Viette